Malevolence is the third full-length album by American rock band New Years Day, released on October 2, 2015 through Another Century Records. The album debuted at No. 8 on Billboards Top Rock Albums chart, selling 19,000 copies in its first week.

On August 11, 2015, the band announced their first headlining tour in support of the album, "The Other Side Tour" with opening acts Eyes Set to Kill, Get Scared, and New Volume. Before the tour started, New Volume dropped off, while The Relapse Symphony and Darksiderz were added to the bill.

Background
Speaking about the album, vocalist Ash Costello said, "Malevolence is the most personal album we have ever written to date. More than ever you can really feel the blood and tears in these lyrics. It wasn't an easy process because it was so emotional but what came from it is honest and real. It's therapeutic and angry but still shows vulnerability.

"Our producer Erik Ron will always start an album by asking me 'what are you feeling right now?" to which I replied 'pissed off.' I think anyone that has suffered through loss, betrayal, insecurity and abandonment will absolutely relate to it. For me, it felt so good to get everything I had been bottling up out and hopefully it helps others in the process."

The song "Defame Me" from the Epidemic EP appears on the CD.

Release
The album's first single "Kill or Be Killed" was debuted while the band was on Warped Tour 2015. Pre-orders became available at the band's merchandise tent the same day the single was officially released.

Track listing
All songs written by Ashley Costello, Erik Ron & Anthony Barro

PersonnelBandAsh Costello - vocals
Nikki Misery - lead guitar
Jeremy Valentyne - rhythm guitar, backing vocals
Nick Rossi - drumsProduction'
Erik Ron - producer, mixer
Sterling Sound - mastering
Modivz - artwork

Charts

References

2015 albums
New Years Day (band) albums
Albums produced by Erik Ron